Bertrand Pointeau is the author of L'entreprise expliquée aux ados (Explaining Business to Teens). He is a senior partner at the management consulting firm, Bain & Company, and was formerly head of its South Korea office.

References

French non-fiction writers
French businesspeople
Living people
Year of birth missing (living people)
French male non-fiction writers